Margaretha "Gretha" Pieck (1898-1920) was a Dutch artist.

Biography 
Pieck was born on 16 August 1898 in Amsterdam. Her father,  (1865-1925) was a painter. Her sister Adriana "Adri" Jacoba Pieck (1894-1982) was a painter, as was her cousin Anton Franciscus Pieck (1895-1987).

Gretha and Adri exhibited together and shared a studio.

Pieck died of Spanish influenza on 31 March 1920  in Maartensdijk at the age of 21. Her work is in the collection of the Stedelijk Museum Amsterdam.

Gallery

References

External links

Further reading
Depenbrock, E. (1983) Het Leven En Werken Van Gretha En Adri Pieck (The Life and Works of Gretha and Adri Pieck), Holkema & Warendorf. 

1898 births
1920 deaths
Artists from Amsterdam
20th-century Dutch artists